Aesernoides is a monotypic genus of leaf beetles indigenous to Australia. The sole species in the genus is Aesernoides nigrofasciatus. This species is found only in the rainforests of north-eastern New South Wales and south-eastern Queensland. 

The genus was described by Martin Jacoby in 1885.

References

External links
FaunaNet: The Chrysomelinae of New South Wales: Aesernoides

Monotypic Chrysomelidae genera
Chrysomelinae
Beetles of Australia
Taxa named by Martin Jacoby